Moraxella saccharolytica is a Gram-negative bacterium in the genus Moraxella, which was isolated from the spinal cord of a child with meningitis.

References

Moraxellaceae
Bacteria described in 1956